Saint Joseph's Dream is a 1600-1650 oil on canvas painting by Guercino, now in the Royal Palace of Naples.

History
It may be a pendant to Jerome, also now in the Palace. It was moved from Parma to Naples with the rest of the Farnese collection in 1734 when the Kingdom of Naples was inherited by Charles of Bourbon. It was recorded in an inventory of the Palace's collections in 1874 but later fell into obscurity.

References

Farnese Collection
Paintings by Guercino
Paintings in the Royal Palace of Naples
Paintings of Saint Joseph